DEPDC5 (or DEP domain-containing 5) is a human protein of poorly understood function but has been associated with cancer in several studies.   It is encoded by a gene of the same name, located on chromosome 22.

Function
The function of DEPDC5 is not yet known, but it has been implicated in intracellular signal transduction based on homology between the DEP domains of DEPDC5 and Dishevelled-1 (DVL1).

Mutations in this gene have been associated to cases of focal epilepsy (doi:10.1038/ng.2601).

Gene
In Homo sapiens, the DEPDC5 gene has been localized to the long arm of chromosome 22, 22q12.2-q12.3, between the PRRL14 and YWHAH genes. The clinical relevance of this gene includes an intronic SNP (rs1012068) that has been associated with a 2-fold hepatocellular carcinoma-risk increase.

Structure

Domains

DEP
The DEP domain derives its name from the proteins Dishevelled, Egl-10 and Pleckstrin, each of which contain a variant of this domain. It spans 82 residues and is 343 amino acids from the C-terminus. A SWISS-MODEL predicts two beta sheets and three alpha helices contained within the domain.

While its exact function is not known, the DEPDC5 DEP domain has the highest structural similarity to the DEP domain of DVL1 when performing a CBLAST at NCBI. The alignment scores an Evalue of 1.00e-08 and indicates 30% identity between the DEP domains of the two proteins. In DVL1, the DEP domain is involved in localization of the protein to the plasma membrane as part of the Wnt signaling pathway.

DUF 3608

The DUF 3608 domain sits 99 amino acids from the N-terminus and itself spans 280 amino acids.  PELE predicts at least one beta sheet and two alpha helices within this domain. It also contains 26 highly conserved residues and several post-translation modifications. Both occurrences are addressed later in this article.

Evidence for the function of DUF 3608 has been uncovered in the yeast homolog Iml1p.  Imlp1's DUF 3608 is thought to aid in binding to two protein partners, Npr2 and Npr3.  Together, these three proteins form the Iml1-Npr2-Npr3 complex and are involved in "non-nitrogen starvation" autophagy regulation. The researchers who uncovered this propose renaming DUF 3608 to RANS (Required for Autophagy induced under Non-nitrogen Starvation conditions).

Secondary Structure

Based on unanimous consensus by the secondary structure prediction tool PELE, DEPDC5 contains at least ten alpha helices and nine beta sheets.  The locations of these secondary structures are illustrated in the image below: red highlights are alpha helices and blue highlights are beta sheets.

Homology

Orthologs
Fungi are the most distantly related organisms to contain a protein orthologous to human DEPDC5, including Saccharomyces cerevisiae and Albugo laibachii.  In the fungi, the protein name is Iml1p, or vacuolar membrane-associated protein Iml1. Name deviations in other organisms include CG12090 (Drosophila) and AGAP007010 (mosquito). Conservation is high between humans and other vertebrate species, ranging from 74% identity in cichlids to 99% identity in chimpanzees.

The following table summarizes an analysis of 20 proteins orthologous to human DEPDC5.  

30 residues have been conserved since animals and fungi diverged, with 26 of these located in the DUF 3608 domain. The following multiple sequence alignment illustrates this conservation of the DUF domain; representatives from invertebrate and fungal clades are aligned to the human DUF 3608 with completely conserved residues colored green.

Paralogs
There are no known human DEPDC5 paralogs, but there are 64 human proteins containing a homologous DEP domain.  There are also no identified paralogs for the yeast protein Iml1, the most distantly related ortholog of human DEPDC5.

Expression 

DEPDC5 expression has been characterized as ubiquitous in human tissue by RT-PCR analysis and in DNA microarray studies as displayed in the chart below.

One study on patients with hepatocellular carcinoma found higher DEPDC5 expression in tumor tissue than in non-tumor tissue. Conversely, a homozygous deletion of three genes, one being DEPDC5, was found in two glioblastoma cases. Other expression anomalies include zero expression in MDA-MB-231 breast cancer cell line and low expression in P116 (ZAP70 negative) cell line.

Post-translational Modifications
The following post-translational modifications were predicted with the proteomic tools compiled at ExPASy  and PhosphoSite Plus for the human DEPDC5 protein.

Interaction
DEPDC5 may possibly interact with the proteasome subunit PSMA3 as evidenced by coimmunoprecipitation and the transcription factor MYC. DEPDC5 is in the "GATOR1" complex with NPRL2 and NPRL3.

References